AdapTV is the world's first dedicated to the mobility impaired, hearing impaired, and visually impaired.
AdapTV initially launched as a network of low power broadcasting stations (LPTV) that all carried the same programming, with the flagship station being KALTV in St. Louis, MO.

History
In late 2011 AdapTV sold or closed down most of its LPTV stations in order to raise funds for and concentrate on a national cable television launch.
In mid 2012, AdapTV began broadcasting in cable markets nationwide. Some viewers who received AdapTV's low power signal are no longer able to receive the channel as their cable company does not carry it leading to a large volume of requests for a relaunch of LPTV stations in those markets or internet streaming of the channel. Officials for the network stated that the latter is in the works.

Prior to AdapTV, the Silent Network and Kaleidescope TV both served all or part of this audience. The Silent Network featured programming with open captioning and sign-language for the hearing impaired and deaf starting in 1980.  The network was later purchased by a private group in San Antonio, TX  who eventually transformed the channel into Kaleidescope TV which was envisioned as a channel for viewers of visual, hearing, mobility and other impairments but later became a general health network before ceasing to broadcast several years later.

Programming
Programming on AdapTV is as diverse as general entertainment networks and broadcast channels for the general viewing community.

Sports

Deaflympics

The network covers live or tape delayed coverage of most sporting events, open and closing ceremonies for the Deaflympics, the Olympics sanctioned sporting event held every four years. The next Deaflympics starts June 23, 2013 in Sofia, Bulgaria

Paralympics

The Paralympics is a major international sporting event for athletes with physical and mobility difficulties andcarried live and in repeats on AdapTV.

Wheelchair racing

AdapTV carries Wheelchair Racing every Sunday afternoon as part of its sports block.

News

AdapTV has the US's only open-captioned news broadcasts and also includes sign-language interpretation and audio description for the visually impaired. All major news stories are covered as well as stories of special interest to AdapTV viewers. Sign-language interpretation has been available on news broadcasts internationally for years including a special programming block on the BBC which AdapTV also carries.

Films and Series

Kids TV

AdapTV provides a wide variety of children's programming including films, cartoons, educational series and more for children who are hard of hearing or deaf, visually impaired or blind or physically or mobility challenged. As well the network seeks to reach the friends of these children and help create an inclusive environment. Much of the programming is produced by AdapTV, colleges for the hearing and visually impaired and the BBC

Events

Miss Deaf America

Miss Deaf America is the precursor to the Miss Deaf International event. The pageant is broadcast live on AdapTV.

Miss Deaf International

The next Miss Deaf International will be broadcast live from Sophia on AdapTV from July 23–27 as it is a multi-day event.
Due to the time difference the pageant will be carried live and with tape delay during US primetime hours.

Formats
Open Captioning

Most programming on AdapTV features open-captioning. This means that viewers do not need to turn on captioning when watching the channel. AdapTV uses enhanced open captioning which uses larger letters and a white background making text much easier to read.

Sign Language Interpretation

Most programming on AdapTV features sign-language interpretation if it is not featuring sign language as the main content of the programming. Sign-language interpretation

Audio description
While as of 2013 a contested Federal mandate in the US requires audio description on certain programming AdapTV has chosen to provide audio description of most of its television programming. Unlike other networks the audio description does not require that viewers activate the service and rather it plays during the main audio feed.

References

External links
Official website
Deafness.about.com
Adage.com
Tdiforaccess.org
Digitalspy.co.uk
Missmisterdeafinternational.org
Acb.org

Television stations in St. Louis
Assistive technology
Subtitling
Transcription (linguistics)